BAV or Bav may refer to:
 Balloon Aortic valvuloplasty, a medical procedure
 Bamboo Airways, a Vietnamese airline
 Banna virus, Reoviridae family
 Baotou Erliban Airport, China
 Battle Athletes Victory, a Japanese anime based on Battle Athletes
 Bavaria, a state of Germany
 Bicuspid aortic valve, a congenital condition of the aortic valve
 Bovine adenovirus, also called BAdV
 Federal Office for Transport (Bundesanstalt für Verkehr, BAV), a government agency of Austria
 Federal Office for Transport (Switzerland) (Bundesanstalt für Verkehr, BAV), a government agency of Switzerland
 Vatican Library, the library of the Holy See, located in Vatican City